Mahmoud El Badry is a professional soccer player at Smouha Sporting Club in the Egyptian Premier League.

He has been playing as a professional player for more than 10 year now, He was the team Captin at El Entag El Harby SC also in the Egyptian Premier League.

Before he transferred to El Entag El Harby SC, he was player at Zamalek SC and Egyptian National Team U20.

References

1991 births
Egyptian footballers
Living people
Association football defenders
Tala'ea El Gaish SC players
Zamalek SC players
El Entag El Harby SC players